B. Lenin born as Bhimsingh Lenin is an Indian film editor, writer and director who works in Tamil, Malayalam and Hindi films. The son of Tamil film maker A. Bhimsingh, Lenin entered the film industry as an assistant editor and went on to work in numerous projects before making his debut as an independent editor with Mahendran's Uthiripookkal (1979). In the mid 1980s, Lenin started jointly working with his long-time assistant V. T. Vijayan and the duo has so far edited over a hundred films in Tamil, Malayalam, Kannada, Telugu and Hindi films, apart from an English film, Eli My Friend.

As of 2017, Lenin has won five National Film Awards, including the awards for Best Direction and Best Editing. He was the chairman of the Film Federation of India of India in 2011.

Biography
Lenin was born in a Bondil Rajput family consisting of eight children. His father A. Bhimsingh was a well known director in Tamil and Hindi films. Lenin started his career as an associate director of his father and assisted in editing many of his films. He also had experience as a lab technician and sound engineering department as well. After several films working as an assistant, Lenin made his debut as an independent editor in 1979 with the 1979 Tamil film Uthiripookkal which was directed by Mahendran. Although he started as an independent editor, he later associated himself with his assistant V. T. Vijayan, and the duo went on to work together in a number of films during the 80s and 90s, including Nayakan, Geethanjali, Anjali and Kadhalan, which won them the National Film Award for Best Editing.

He made his directorial debut in 1983 with Ethanai Konam Ethanai Paarvai (1983), and went on to direct four feature films and four non-feature films. His short film Knock-out (1992) was critically acclaimed as it went on to win the Islamia critics Award for Best Short Film at the Cairo International Film Festival. It also won the National Film Award for Best First Non-Feature Film of a Director for Lenin. The jury noted: "The director has given us a powerful insight into the labyrinth of the human mind faced with a disaster situation". Three years later, he directed his second short film tilted Kutravali, which won the Best Editing at the 43rd National Film Awards. In 2002, Lenin made Ooruku Nooruper. The film fetched him the Best Direction award, apart from winning the Best Regional Film (Tamil). The film dealt with capital punishment and was received with critical response. He has also directed a few TV serials including Solladi Sivasakthi. Lenin has held important positions such as the jury member of 57th National Film Awards (2010) and the chairman of Oscar selection committee (of FFI) in 2011. And now he is contributing heavily to the education society thorough various institutions like Pune Film Institute, Lenin now works along with a reputed film institute in Coimbatore named Clusters media college as its dean helping its students gain knowledge in real time professional movie making and guiding them through his wide experience in film industry

Selected filmography

As editor

As director

As actor

As assistant editor

Awards

National Film Awards
 1992 – Knock-Out – Best First Non-Feature Film of a Director (Also producer)
 1994 – Kaadhalan – Best Editing (shared with V. T. Vijayan)
 1995 – Kutravali and Oodaha – Best Non-Feature Film Editing (shared with V. T. Vijayan)
 2001 – Ooruku Nooruper – National Film Award for Best Direction
 2001 – Ooruku Nooruper – National Film Award for Best Feature Film in Tamil

Tamil Nadu State Film Awards
 1988 – Best Editor
 1994 – Best Editor – Kaadhalan
 2010 – Best Editor – Namma Gramam

Kerala State Film Awards
 1990 – Best Editor
 1993 – Best Editor – Sopanam

Vijay Awards
 2006 – Vijay Awards Special Jury Award for Editing

Rotary Club Of Madras East
2017 -Dronacharya Award

References

External links

Tamil film directors
Living people
Telugu film editors
Best Director National Film Award winners
Malayalam film editors
Tamil Nadu State Film Awards winners
Best Editor National Film Award winners
Kerala State Film Award winners
Tamil film editors
20th-century Indian film directors
21st-century Indian film directors
Film directors from Tamil Nadu
Screenwriters from Tamil Nadu
Kannada film editors
Tamil screenwriters
Film editors from Tamil Nadu
1947 births